Geez is an independent quarterly magazine dealing with issues of spirituality, social justice, religion, and progressive cultural politics. The byline of Geez was "holy mischief in an age of fast faith". In 2015 the byline was changed to "contemplative cultural resistance". Geez is based in Detroit and distributes in Canada, the U.S and abroad.

Geez was founded in Winnipeg, Manitoba in 2005 by Aiden Enns and Will Braun. Geez looks at religion, spirituality, and politics through the eyes of its readers. Geez is known for its pointed illustrations, graphics and unique combination of satire, critique, social consciousness, and quirkiness. The magazine says it's for "people at the fringes of faith".

History
The founder of Geez magazine, Aiden Enns, originally had the idea of the magazine in 2003 while he was working as managing editor at Adbusters in Vancouver. Enns then moved to Winnipeg and recruited writer and activist Will Braun who came on board as co-editor and co-publisher. The graphic design for the magazine is done by Darryl Brown. Geez has hosted annual sermon contests.

Aiden Enns founded the Buy Nothing Christmas movement. He has encouraged participation in the anti-consumerist movement throughout his career at Geez.

The first issue of Geez was published in Fall 2005 with an initial 500 paying subscribers and no advertising revenue. In the first year, the number of subscribers climbed to 2,000.

In 2009, Geez moved its hub from Enns' home to a community-minded church in Winnipeg's inner-city (Knox United Church).

In 2010, Aiden Enns did an interview on CKUT-FM discussing Geez.

In 2010, Geez celebrated its 5th anniversary. At the time, Darin Barney, the Canadian Research Chair in Technology and Citizenship said, Geez is one of the "smartest kind of progressive, critical, lefty magazines."

In 2012, Geez sponsored an Earth Day tent revival service with Charleswood Mennonite Church.

From the beginning, the aim of Geez was to "put the 'geez' into Jesus." A religious magazine for a new generation of Christians and post-Christians, the up-and-coming magazine wanted a short, provocative name that risked offending more conservative readers. Some consider the name blasphemous because it is an expletive derived from the name of Jesus.

In 2019, Geez relocated to Detroit, Michigan. Aiden Enns stepped down from his position as the editor and Lydia Wylie-Kellermann filled the role.

Awards

Regular sections
In addition to a large feature section, Geez has several different sections: Culturosities (arts and culture), Experiments, Civil Disobedience, Reviews, Feministry, updates from Christian Peacemaker Teams, the Catholic Worker Movement, and highlights from the LGBTQ community.

Media reports and comments
In 2006, Mary Hynes from CBC Radio Tapestry did a feature interview with Aiden Enns and Will Braun.

In July 2007, the National Post called the presentation of the magazine "intriguing".

Geez is a "unique combination of satire, critique, social consciousness, and just plain quirkiness," Brenda Suderman, August 2007, the Winnipeg Free Press.

"Restless questioning gives the magazine its edgy tone," Caley Moore, November 2007, the United Church Observer.

"In each quarterly issue of Geez, people of faith are invited to challenge structures of power and embody joyful alternatives," Christina Crook, January 2008, BC Christian News.

The magazine is an "exasperated exclamation derived from Jesus' name that some Christians consider to be blasphemous," Julia Duin, July 2009, The Washington Times.

In 2010, Michael Enright from The Sunday Edition interviewed Aiden Enns.

"Readers were so in love with the cheeky, contrarian 'post-Christian' quarterly that many were paying more than the annual $35 subscription to ensure its survival," Leslie Scrivener, January 2011, the Toronto Star.

"It pokes, piques and prods Christians, and the unconverted among its readers to lie out the revolutionary values of Jesus in a consumer-driven, post-modern, materialist world," Nancy Haught, The Portland Oregonian, April 2006.

"A stylish magazine in the tradition of Adbusters and Mother Jones . . . a surprisingly hip, bold take on Christianity," Gloria Kim, Maclean's, January 2005.

"The magazine tries to ask questions that we normally don't ask . . . They take the work they're doing seriously. But they don't take themselves all that seriously," Bill Phipps, as quoted in United Church Observer, November 2007.

Geez pushes "the edge of respectability in a subversive, ecological, visionary way," Douglas Todd, Vancouver Sun, March 2007.

"Shows no signs of disappearing," Lauren Parsons, The Uniter, December 2010.

"Geez is very good at opening minds to creative ways of seeing the world and pursuing social justice," Samantha Rideout, January 2011, United Church Observer.

References

External links
 Official website
 
 

2005 establishments in Manitoba
Cultural magazines published in Canada
Quarterly magazines published in Canada
Magazines about spirituality
Anti-consumerist groups
Magazines established in 2005
Magazines published in Manitoba
Mass media in Winnipeg
Cultural magazines published in the United States
Magazines published in Detroit
Quarterly magazines published in the United States